Damian Świerblewski (born 17 January 1984 in Bydgoszcz) is a Polish footballer who plays as a midfielder for Marcovia Marki.

External links
 

1984 births
Polish footballers
Ekstraklasa players
I liga players
IV liga players
Zawisza Bydgoszcz players
Widzew Łódź players
ŁKS Łomża players
Podbeskidzie Bielsko-Biała players
Ruch Chorzów players
MKP Pogoń Siedlce players
Ząbkovia Ząbki players
Living people
Sportspeople from Bydgoszcz
Association football midfielders